Priyanshu Painyuli is an Indian actor and model who appears in Bollywood films. In 2020, he appeared in Netflix original Extraction, an American action-thriller film and Mirzapur 2, an Amazon Prime Video action crime thriller series.

Personal life 

He married his girlfriend of seven years, Vandana Joshi, on 26 November 2020.

Career
Priyanshu started his career as a model and assistant director. He made his acting debut with Manuja Tyagi's movie Love At First Sight. After this film, he got an offer from Farhan Akhtar for remake film Rock On 2.

In 2018, he featured in Vikramaditya Motwane's Bhavesh Joshi Superhero in which he played the role of Bhavesh Joshi. He played Robin (Radhesyam) in the second season of Mirzapur an Amazon Prime Video action crime thriller series. Painyuli also appeared in High Jack and in Once Again in 2018. He played the role of Kapil in 2019 Netflix film Upstarts.

In 2020, he played the role of a Bangladeshi crime lord in Sam Hargrave's directorial debut Extraction. He starred opposite Taapsee Pannu in the sports film Rashmi Rocket''.

Filmography

Films

Web series

References

External links
 

1988 births
Living people
Indian male film actors
Male actors from Mumbai
Male actors in Hindi cinema